Woolsthorpe-by-Colsterworth (to distinguish it from Woolsthorpe-by-Belvoir in the same county) is a hamlet in the South Kesteven district of Lincolnshire, England. It is best known as the birthplace of Sir Isaac Newton.

The A1 is the old Great North Road, on which Colsterworth grew. Woolsthorpe is two to three miles from the county boundary with Leicestershire, and four from Rutland.

Woolsthorpe lies in rural surroundings. It sits on Lower Lincolnshire Limestone, below which are the Lower Estuarine Series and the Northampton sand of the Inferior Oolite Series of the Jurassic period. The Northampton Sand here is cemented by iron and in the 20th century the hamlet was almost surrounded by strip mining for iron ore. In 1973 the local quarries closed due to competition from imported iron ore. The same year the Great Northern Railway's High Dyke branch line closed it was opened in 1916 to carry iron ore, and lay to the north of the village. There was an unsuccessful attempt to preserve the line. The railway's bridge spanned the A1 until it was removed in 2009 during road junction improvements.

Woolsthorpe Manor, Newton's birthplace, is a typical  17th-century yeoman farmer's limestone house, with later farmyard buildings. It is owned by the National Trust and is open to the public.

References

 Ordnance Survey
 Geological Survey 1:50 000 Sheet 143.

External links

 Woolsthorpe by Colsterworth page in the website of England's Local Heritage Initiative
 Railways and quarries around Woolsthorpe by Colsterworth in 1963

Hamlets in Lincolnshire
South Kesteven District